Zack Chetrat (born August 9, 1990 in Toronto, Ontario) is a Canadian butterfly swimmer.

References

External links
 Biography at swimming.ca

Living people
1990 births
Canadian male butterfly swimmers
Swimmers from Toronto
Swimmers at the 2015 Pan American Games
Pan American Games silver medalists for Canada
Pan American Games bronze medalists for Canada
Pan American Games medalists in swimming
Medalists at the 2015 Pan American Games